Pilot Hill (formerly, Centerville, Pilothill, and Pittsfield) is an unincorporated community in El Dorado County, California.

In 1849, mining commenced at Pilot Hill. Originally, Centerville, Pilot Hill, and Pittsfield were separate nearby mining camps that unified under the name Centerville. The post office came in 1854 and bestowed the name Pilot Hill.
Farm Trails - Pilot Hill is on the Farm Trails Map.  Lavender, Olives and Grapes can be picked seasonally at Enchanted April Farm on historic Salmon Falls Road in Pilot Hill.

References

Unincorporated communities in California
Unincorporated communities in El Dorado County, California
1849 establishments in California